Goran Miljanović (2 October 1956 – 25 March 2008) was a Bosnian-Herzegovinian Serb football player who spent the majority of his career at Sloboda Tuzla.

Club career
After leaving Sloboda, he played in Belgium for Lierse and third level Herentals, while working in one of their sponsor's stockings factory.

International career
Miljanović made his debut for Yugoslavia in a March 1983 friendly match away against Romania and has earned a total of 4 caps, scoring 1 goal. His final international was a June 1988 friendly against West Germany.

Personal life
After retiring as a player, he coached amateur side Netegalm. He was married to Dragica. He died in Herentals hospital in 2008 after a serious illness and was survived by Dragica and their sons Milan and Nenad.

References

External links

Profile at Serbian federation official site
Goran Miljanovic has died

1956 births
2008 deaths
People from Lopare
Association football midfielders
Yugoslav footballers
Yugoslavia international footballers
Bosnia and Herzegovina footballers
FK Jedinstvo Brčko players
FK Sloboda Tuzla players
Lierse S.K. players
Yugoslav First League players
Belgian Pro League players
Belgian Third Division players
Yugoslav expatriate footballers
Expatriate footballers in Belgium
Yugoslav expatriate sportspeople in Belgium
Bosnia and Herzegovina expatriate footballers
Bosnia and Herzegovina expatriate sportspeople in Belgium